Wolfgang Max Paul Gaede (25 May 1878 – 24 June 1945) was a German physicist and pioneer of vacuum engineering.

Life 

Gaede was born in Lehe, Bremerhaven, the son of Prussian Colonel Karl Gaede and Amalia, nee Renf.  In 1897 he began studying medicine at the University of Freiburg, but he soon switched to the field of physics.  In 1901 he wrote his doctoral thesis on the change of the specific heat of metals with temperature. Subsequent research on the Volta effect in a vacuum was unsuccessful, as the pump technology of the time could not create sufficient vacuum for the investigations. This prompted Gaede to deal more closely with vacuum technology. He invented the rotating mercury pump for high vacuum, which he presented to his scientific colleagues in 1905 at a congress in Merano. Also in Freiburg im Breisgau, Gaede wrote his habilitation thesis on The external friction of gases in 1909.

In 1913 he received a professorship at the University of Freiburg. In the following six years, he invented the momentum transfer pump (molecular pump) and a mercury diffusion pump. In 1919, Gaede joined the Karlsruhe Institute of Technology as a professor of experimental physics, where he worked in the following research areas:
 Vacuum technology
 Radio and communications technology
 Process for obtaining pure hydrogen and mercury
 Exploration of lightning protection equipment
 Movement of liquids in a rotating hollow ring

In 1930, Gaede was elected a member of the Academy of Sciences Leopoldina. In 1933/34 two employees denounced Gaede to the Gestapo, as having called the National Socialists "childish". He then had to retire, although all allegations proved to be false. Despite this incident, the Werner von Siemens Ring for 1933 was given to him in 1934. He also received various awards at international level in the following years.

A lifelong consultancy contract from 1906 with Leybold GmbH of Cologne made it possible for him to continue his research in his private laboratory in Karlsruhe and later in Munich. Among other things, he invented the gas ballast principle. Gaede was the owner of almost 40 patents in Germany, and many others abroad. A call to return to the university in Karlsruhe after the end of the war did not reach Gaede.

Gaede died in Munich in 1945.

Honours and memorials 
 Elliott Cresson Medal, Franklin Institute, Philadelphia, 1909
 Duddell Medal and Prize, Physical Society of London, 1932
 A lecture hall of the Karlsruhe University, named in 1969
 Wolfgang-Gaede-Strasse, on the university grounds in Karlsruhe, named in 1993
 Gaedestraße in Cologne, beside Oerlikon Leybold Vacuum GmbH

The GAEDE Foundation, administered by the German Vacuum Society (DVG), grants young scientists the Gaede Award for work in the field of vacuum-assisted sciences.  It maintains the Gaede archive at the Leybold GmbH headquarters in Cologne.

References

Further reading 
 Harriet Unzeitig: Zwischen Wissenschaft und Technik - zu den Pumpenerfindungen Wolfgang Gaedes von 1900-1914 (Between science and technology - on the pump discoveries of Wolfgang Gaede from 1900-1914). Dissertation, Ludwig Maximilian University of Munich, 2000, .

External links 
 
 Träger des Werner-von-Siemens-Ringes (Holders of the Werner von Siemens Ring 
 Deutsche Vakuumgesellschaft (DVG) (German Vacuum Society) 

Members of the German Academy of Sciences Leopoldina
University of Freiburg alumni
Academic staff of the University of Freiburg
Werner von Siemens Ring laureates
People from Bremerhaven
20th-century German physicists
1878 births
1945 deaths